The following radio stations broadcast on FM frequency 89.6 MHz:

Indonesia
PM2FGE /I-Radio in Jakarta
PM3FAE / Visi FM in Medan
XBT FM (PM2___) in West Lombok

Greece
Ioannina Radio DeeJay 89.6

New Zealand
The Hits, Wanganui

United Kingdom
Westside 89.6FM, Hanwell, Greater London

References 

Lists of radio stations by frequency